Ángel Hernández Yáñez (born April 15, 1966 in Ávila) is a retired Spanish long jumper who won a silver medal at the 1990 European Championships, jumping .

Hernández won the Spanish national championship in 1989, 1990, 1993 and 1994.

Competition record

External links
 
 
 

1966 births
Living people
People from Ávila, Spain
Sportspeople from the Province of Ávila
Spanish male long jumpers
Olympic athletes of Spain
Athletes (track and field) at the 1992 Summer Olympics
World Athletics Championships athletes for Spain
European Athletics Championships medalists